Salami (also Romanized as Salamī, Salāmī, and Salāmey; also known as Salmān) is a city and capital of Salami District, Khaf County, Razavi Khorasan Province, Iran. At the 2006 census, its population was 6,056, in 1,341 families.

Location 
Salami city is one of the big cities of Khaf city, which is located at a distance of 90 km from Torbat Heydarieh and 25 km from Khaf.

References 

Populated places in Khaf County
Cities in Razavi Khorasan Province